Alcalatén is a comarca in the province of Castellon, Valencian Community, Spain.

Municipalities 

The comarca is composed of nine municipalities, listed below with their populations according to the most recent official estimates (as at 1 January 2019):

Notes

References 

 
Comarques of the Valencian Community
Geography of the Province of Castellón